Harbor Island is a small artificial island in Newport Beach, California. Newport Harbor is a semi-artificial harbor that was formed by dredging an estuary during the early 1900s. Several artificial islands were built, including Harbor Island, now covered with about thirty private homes. It is a gated community and is home to many very expensive homes. Every home is along one street, Harbor Island Road, and each plot has waterfront access with one or more boat docks. Notable residents include George Argyros, Donald Bren, and Bill Gross.

See also
History of Newport Beach
Balboa Island
List of islands of California

References

External links

Neighborhoods in Newport Beach, California
Islands of Newport Beach, California
Artificial islands of California
Gated communities in California
Islands of Southern California
Islands of California